Rizal Technological University (RTU) is a state university located at Mandaluyong, Philippines. It was established on July 11, 1969, as the College of Rizal, part of the University of Rizal System before it became autonomous in 1975. The state university is also the first educational institution in the country to use cooperative education as a curriculum plan which is recognized by various industries, businesses and agencies all over the country. The university has various different academic fields, and focuses primarily on architecture, engineering, and technology programs.

RTU is also one of the first educational institutions in the Philippines to offer degrees in astronomy.

History

College of Rizal
The Rizal Technological University or RTU was established on July 11, 1969, upon the approval by the Secretary of Education in response to the request of the Provincial Board of Rizal,  headed by then Governor Isidro S. Rodriguez, to put up a higher education institution in the Province of Rizal. It was first known as the College of Rizal.

The College of Rizal opened its classes on July 14, 1969, with course offerings in business administration, education and liberal arts.

Rizal Technological College
On March 20, 1975, the College of Rizal in Pasig and Rizal Technical High School in Mandaluyong,  both situated in the Province of Rizal, were merged and converted into the Rizal Technological College (RTC) by the virtue of Presidential Decree (PD) No. 674 The decree authorized the expansion of curricular programs and promotion of researches in the development and conservation of natural resources in the Province of Rizal. The promulgation of P.D. No. 751 on July 25, 1975, amended certain provisions of P.D. No. 674 and made the operation and maintenance of the Rizal Technological Colleges a joint project and undertaking of the Provincial Government of Rizal and the Meralco Foundation, Incorporated. This Decree broadened the support and strengthened the organization of the college.

In 1975, upon the establishment of the Metropolitan Manila Commission, Pasig and Mandaluyong was transferred to the territorial jurisdiction of the Metro Manila. The Province of Rizal could not continue supporting financially the Colleges. Several alternatives were proposed to save the RTC. One was to transfer the management and administration of the RTC to one of the existing towns in the Province of Rizal or Metro Manila. The worst possible alternative was to phase out the Colleges. The leadership, the faculty, and the students of the Colleges would not allow this to happen, however, so they worked out the possible nationalization of the RTC. Through the support of then Metropolitan Manila Governor Imelda Marcos, the RTC constituency, with the Kabataang Barangay School Chapter of the RTC, and the Collegiate and High School Faculty Clubs at the forefront of the struggle for survival, President Ferdinand E. Marcos signed into law Presidential Decree 1341-A on April 1, 1978, converting the Rizal Technological Colleges into a State College. The decree, however, was received only on October 13, 1978; thus, the RTC has been celebrating its College Week, and later its University Week on the days centered on October 13.

University status

After 19 years, the college was converted into the Rizal Technological University on October 11, 1997, by virtue of Republic Act (RA) No. 8365. The university is tasked to: provide highly professional, scientific, technological and special instructions in the fields of engineering and technology, education, business and entrepreneurial technology, and the programs; and promote research, extension and advance studies in its areas of specialization.

RTU Today
As of A.Y. 2021–2022, the university has a total of 28,013 enrolled students from both campuses.

Notable alumni
 Jan Michael Silverio Tan, Ultimate Male Survivor in the second batch of the reality show StarStruck aired on GMA Network.
 Ed Daquioag - RTU-LHS - Player for Rain or Shine Elasto Painters
 Nesthy Petecio, Filipina amateur boxer.

Administrators
The university has been placed under the stewardship of seven administrators:

As College of Rizal (1969–1975)
 Dr. Jose M. Singson - Executive Dean (1969)
 Dr. Marcial R. Rañosa - Acting Executive Dean (1969–1974)
 Dr. Lydia M. Profeta - Executive Dean (1974–1975)

As Rizal Technological Colleges (locally funded - 1975–1978)
 Dr. Julio Balmes - Officer-in-Charge (1975–1976)
 Dr. Lydia M. Profeta - Executive Dean (1976–1978)

As Rizal Technological Colleges (state college, nationally funded - 1979–1997)
 Dr. Lydia M. Profeta - Acting President (1979–1986)
 Dr. Josefina V. Estolas - Officer-in-Charge (1986–1987) and College President (1987–1993)
 Dr. Jose Q. Macaballug - Officer-in-Charge (1993) and College President (1993–1997)

As Rizal Technological University (1997–present)
 Dr. Jose Q. Macaballug - University President (1997–2010) and Officer-In-Charge (2010–November 5, 2010)
 Dr. Jesus Rodrigo F. Torres - University President (November 6, 2010–November 6, 2018)
 Dr. Ma. Eugenia M. Yangco - University President (November 16, 2018–present)

Campuses and locations
The campus of RTU is located along Boni Avenue in Barangay Malamig, Mandaluyong. It has an extension campus located at Barangay Maybunga, Pasig.

RTU's Antipolo Campus was transferred to the University of Rizal System.

RTU Baras campus is set to be the seat of Department of Science and Technology's Center for Astronomy Research and Development (RTU-DOST-CARD) and will be the hub of astronomical research in the Philippines. The  owned by the university will have an observatory, a planetarium, and a lecture hall.

Laboratory School

Under the new organizational structure, the Rizal Technological University - Laboratory School (RTU-LS), is the high school department of the RTU and it is situated inside the main campus in Mandaluyong. The Laboratory School provides secondary curriculum with added technology-based subjects such as electronics, civil technology, drafting, metal works and machine shop, business technology for boys and girls, food trades and garment trades for girls only. The RTU - Laboratory School also serves as the training for teacher education programs of the college student-teachers of the College of Education. The levels are Grades 7 to 12.

Athletics
The RTU varsity teams are called Blue Thunders. The women's teams are called the Lady Thunders, while the juniors' (high school) teams are called the Baby Thunders. RTU Blue Thunders won the SCUAA Over-All Championship six times and the 2009 Over-All Champion in 13th UniGames in CPU, Iloilo.

The RTU Blue Thunders men's basketball team won the silver medal in 2009 Penang Unity Chief Basketball Minister Friendship Cup invitational basketball tournament. The following are the varsity sports at RTU: Basketball, Volleyball, Chess, Lawn Tennis, Table Tennis, Athletics, Baseball, Softball, Swimming, Boxing, Cheer dance, Dance Sports, Track and Field, Sepak Takraw, Badminton, Taekwondo, Arnis, Beach Volleyball.

See also
List of universities and colleges in the Philippines
State Colleges and Universities Athletic Association
State University and Colleges Official Directory of the Republic of the Philippines

References

External links
Rizal Technological University Official Website
Rizal Technological University Website - History
REPUBLIC ACT NO. 8365 - Converting The Rizal Technological Colleges into A STATE UNIVERSITY, To be known as THE RIZAL TECHNOLOGICAL UNIVERSITY

Educational institutions established in 1969
1969 establishments in the Philippines
State universities and colleges in Metro Manila
Education in Mandaluyong
Establishments by Philippine presidential decree